Dunky Wright, born Duncan MacLeod Wright on 22 September 1896, was a Scottish athlete who competed for Great Britain in the 1924 Summer Olympics, in the 1928 Summer Olympics, and in the 1932 Summer Olympics. He was born and died in Glasgow.

In 1924 he did not finish the Olympic marathon race. Four years later he finished 20th in the 1928 Olympic marathon. His final Olympic appearance was in 1932 when he finished fourth in the marathon event.

At the 1930 Empire Games he won the gold medal in the marathon competition and in the 1934 Empire Games he won the bronze medal in the marathon contest.
He won The Morpeth, a long running race in England, a record of seven times between 1927 and 1934. He died on 21 August 1976.

References

1896 births
1976 deaths
Olympic athletes of Great Britain
Athletes (track and field) at the 1924 Summer Olympics
Athletes (track and field) at the 1928 Summer Olympics
Athletes (track and field) at the 1932 Summer Olympics
Athletes (track and field) at the 1930 British Empire Games
Athletes (track and field) at the 1934 British Empire Games
Commonwealth Games gold medallists for Scotland
Commonwealth Games bronze medallists for Scotland
Commonwealth Games medallists in athletics
Scottish Olympic competitors
Sportspeople from Glasgow
Scottish male marathon runners
Medallists at the 1930 British Empire Games
Medallists at the 1934 British Empire Games